"Moja domovina" is a Croatian patriotic song originally recorded in 1991 as a charity single by a supergroup  called  featuring a number of prominent local musicians from all musical genres. The authors of the music and lyrics are Zrinko Tutić and Rajko Dujmić. The song was arranged by Nikša Bratoš, while the instrumental solos were composed by Damir Lipošek, Vedran Božić, and Husein Hasanefendić.

The song was released in the initial stages of the 1991–95 Croatian War of Independence and was first aired on 15 September 1991 on state television HRT after the evening news programme Dnevnik.

Background

Apart from its humanitarian purpose, the group was significant in that it marked the beginning of an independent Croatian music scene and the end of the Yugoslavian music scene. Among those rock groups who adopted a firm Croatian identity and participated in the single were Film, Novi fosili, Magazin, Parni Valjak, Psihomodo Pop, and Prljavo Kazalište.

Despite the time which has passed since the song's first release, its popularity hasn't diminished through the years. During the Croatian War of Independence, it was often played to boost morale either among soldiers on the battlefield or civilians in their shelters. In recent times, the song is usually sung during important sports events and represents a symbol of unity and pride. According to numerous surveys, "Moja domovina" is the most popular patriotic song among Croatian citizens ever written.

List of performers (Croatian Band Aid)

 Ivo Amulić
 Mladen Bodalec
 Dalibor Brun
 Meri Cetinić
 Đuka Čaić
 Arsen Dedić
 Ljupka Dimitrovska
 Sanja Doležal
 Oliver Dragojević
 Doris Dragović
 Dino Dvornik
 Davor Gobac
 Milo Hrnić
 Matko Jelavić
 Vlado Kalember
 Tereza Kesovija
 Emilija Kokić
 Zorica Kondža
 Mišo Kovač
 Josipa Lisac
 Danijela Martinović
 Tatjana Matejaš
 Dragutin Mlinarec
 Ljiljana Nikolovska
 Gabi Novak
 Boris Novković
 Aki Rahimovski
 Ivo Robić
 Krunoslav Slabinac
 Jasmin Stavros
 Jura Stublić
 Stanko Šarić
 Ivica Šerfezi
 Zdravko Škender
 Zvonko Špišić
 Severina Vučković
 Zdenka Vučković
 Jasna Zlokić

Lyrics

References

External links
 
 
 

Croatian patriotic songs
Songs about Croatia
1991 songs